Ivan Inzoudine (born 10 December 1996) is a French professional footballer who plays as a left-back for Championnat National 2 club Chambly.

Club career

Lens 
Inzoudine is a product of AF Bobigny and later joined Lens as a U14 player. He made his debut for the club's B-team in the Championnat National 2 in August 2014 and played a total of 29 games for the team. However, after struggling to get through to the first team, he left the club in the summer 2016.

Guingamp 
After a successful trial, including a friendly game against Brest, Inzoudine joined Guingamp on 17 July 2016, where he was registered for the club's B-team. Inzoudine was a regular starter for the club's B-team in the Championnat National 3, which also earned him a spot on the bench for two first team games: The first one in Coupe de France on 1 March 2017 and the second one two days later in Ligue 1. However, he never made his first team debut before leaving the club at the end of the season.

Messina 
Inzoudine moved to Italy and joined Serie D club Messina in January 2018. He made 9 appearances in Serie D for the club.

Cavese 
In the summer 2018, Inzoudine moved to Serie C club Cavese with his manager from Messina, Giacomo Modica, who had been appointed new manager of Cavese. He made 15 appearances for Cavese, 13 of them in the Serie C, before the club announced on 31 January 2019, that his contract had been terminated by mutual consent.

Marsala 
Having been without a club since January 2019, Inzoudine joined Serie D club Marsala on 17 December 2019.

Marina di Ragusa 
After about seven months as a free agent, Inzoudine returned to the Italian Serie D by signing with ASD Marina di Ragusa in mid-February 2021.

Return to France 
After three years in Italy, Inzoudine returned to France when he on 6 June 2021 signed with Championnat National 2 club Saint-Malo. On 5 June 2022 it was confirmed, that Inzoudine had signed with fellow league club Chambly.

References

External links 
 
 

Living people
1996 births
Association football fullbacks
French footballers
French expatriate footballers
Championnat National 2 players
Championnat National 3 players
Serie C players
Serie D players
Football Club 93 Bobigny-Bagnolet-Gagny players
RC Lens players
En Avant Guingamp players
A.C.R. Messina players
Cavese 1919 players
S.S.D. Marsala Calcio players
US Saint-Malo players
FC Chambly Oise players
French expatriate sportspeople in Italy
Expatriate footballers in Italy